Mutatis mutandis may refer to:
Mutatis mutandis, a Medieval Latin phrase meaning "the necessary changes having been made" or "once the necessary changes have been made".
Mutatis Mutandis (album), a 1991 album by American rock guitarist Ronnie Montrose. 
Mutatis Mutandis, a 2005 album by French singer Juliette (French singer).